Jack Messina (born September 2, 2007) is an American teen actor, best known for his role as Cal Stone in the NBC/Netflix sci-fi drama Manifest.

Early life
Messina started acting at the age of seven, attending classes at the Actors Garage in Manhasset, Long Island, just east of New York City.

Career
Messina made an appearance on the Emmy award-winning The Marvelous Mrs. Maisel alongside Alex Borstein as younger son in an Italian immigrant family. Between 2018 and 2021, Messina played a main role as Cal Stone on NBC's science fiction drama Manifest as a young boy struggling with terminal leukaemia and a passenger on the mysterious returning airplane Flight 828. He played the character for the first three seasons, 43 episodes in total, but did not return for season 4. 

In 2022, Messina starred as 'Chase' in the coming-of-age teenage drama film Over/Under which co-statred Anastasia Veronica Lee and Emajean Bullock. 

Messina has made appearances in commercials for Eliquis and MVP Health. 

Messina is a member of SAG-AFTRA, which has strict rules about children working on set; Messina has private tutoring on site to keep up with schoolwork.

Personal life
Messina is keen on skiing during the winter. Messina's future hopes are to someday work with either Will Ferrell, Jim Carrey or Tom Hanks.

Filmography

Television

References

External links
 

21st-century American male actors
American male child actors
American male television actors
Living people
Male actors from New York City
2007 births
Place of birth missing (living people)